Pöge or Poege is a German surname. Notable people with the surname include:

 Thomas Pöge (born 1979), German bobsledder
 Willy Pöge (1869–1914), German engineer and racing car driver

See also
 Poage

German-language surnames